Don Muse (born July 16, 1952) is a retired Canadian football player who played for the Edmonton Eskimos. He played college football at the University of Missouri.

References

1952 births
Living people
Edmonton Elks players